"That's What I Get for Lovin' You" is a song written by Kent Blazy and Neil Thrasher, and recorded by American country music group Diamond Rio.  It was released in April 1996 as the second single from their album IV.  It peaked at number 4 in the United States, and number 19 in Canada. It was featured on the Greatest Hits II collection in 2006.

Content
In this song, the narrator says how his love has turned him around and that the rewards of loving someone is "a dream that is real" and "a heart that beats true". No music video was made for this song.

Chart performance

Year-end charts

References

1996 singles
1995 songs
Diamond Rio songs
Songs written by Neil Thrasher
Songs written by Kent Blazy
Arista Nashville singles